Ronald Arthur Sarasin (born December 31, 1934) is a former American politician from Connecticut. He served two terms in the Connecticut House of Representatives and three  terms as a U.S. Representative.

Early life and career
Born in Fall River, Massachusetts, Sarasin attended Center Elementary School in Beacon Falls, Connecticut and graduated from Naugatuck (Connecticut) High School in 1952.  He served in the United States Navy from 1952 to 1956 and attained the rank of petty officer, second class.  He earned his B.S. from the University of Connecticut in 1960 and J.D. from the University of Connecticut School of Law in 1963. He was admitted to the Connecticut Bar later that year. He served as the town counsel for Beacon Falls, Connecticut from 1963 to 1972 and an assistant professor of law at New Haven College, New Haven, Connecticut from 1963 to 1966.

Political career 

He was first elected to the Connecticut House of Representatives in 1968 and became the assistant minority leader in 1970. In 1972, he ran for Congress from the 5th district against John Monagan, a seven-term veteran of the House. Redistricting added several Republican areas to the 5th in 1972 and George McGovern’s poor showing in the 1972 presidential election was hurting Democrats in down-ballot races. Sarasin defeated Monagan narrowly.

In 1974, he defeated William R. Ratchford, prevailing amidst the wave of Republican losses to the Watergate babies.

He served as a delegate to the Connecticut State Republican conventions in 1968, 1970, 1972, and 1974 and to the Republican National Convention in 1976.

In 1978, he secured the Republican nomination for Governor of Connecticut with Lewis Rome as his running mate. His opponent was the incumbent, Ella Grasso, the first woman to be elected governor in her own right. Sarasin attacked Grasso on taxes, promising to reduce taxes and cut welfare spending. On Election Day, Grasso won a second term in office with a convincing victory

Later career

After leaving office, he was the chief lobbyist for the National Restaurant Association and president of the National Beer Wholesalers Association.

He served as president of the U.S. Capitol Historical Society from 2000 to 2019.

Personal life
Sarasin was married to Marjorie Grazio Sarasin and has one son. He and his wife divorced in 1977. He is the first divorced candidate for governor.

His brother Warren Sarasin, was also a politician who served in the Connecticut House of Representatives. He was first elected in 1978, the year his brother was defeated for governor.

References

External links

1934 births
Living people
Republican Party members of the Connecticut House of Representatives
Politicians from Fall River, Massachusetts
University of Connecticut alumni
University of Connecticut School of Law alumni
United States Navy sailors
Republican Party members of the United States House of Representatives from Connecticut
People from Beacon Falls, Connecticut